Lou Rogers (November 26, 1879 – March 11, 1952) was a cartoonist, illustrator, writer, storyteller, public speaker, radio host, and political activist.

Family and youth 

Born Annie Lucasta Rogers in 1879 in the lumbering town of Patten, Maine, Rogers was the fourth of seven children born to Col. Luther Bailey "L. B." Rogers and Mary Elizabeth Barker Rogers. Her childhood was spent on a small farm,  with vacations at the family's isolated camp at nearby Shin Pond, where pristine woodlands abutted the quiet lake. From an early age she loved to draw, producing sketches and caricatures, including ones of her teachers.  The Rogers children were educated at the Patten Academy that grandfather Dr. Luther Rogers helped found. After working at a district school,  Rogers was hired as an assistant to teach at the Patten Academy.  Education was a family value, and her siblings studied at the University of Maine and McGill University. Brother Lore Rogers became a well-known government bacteriologist and was awarded two honorary doctorates.

Becoming a cartoonist 
Around 1900 Rogers decided on a career in art and enrolled at the Massachusetts Normal Art School,  now the Massachusetts College of Art and Design. By her own account, her spirited personality and predilection to explore the city of Boston proved incompatible with these studies.  After one year she dropped out.  She then enrolled in physical culture classes offered in Washington DC.  Afterwards she signed on to a business venture with a classmate, where they traveled out West offering physical culture seminars to communities.  Because they lacked business experience, it was a financial disaster.  She soon had a new determination: she would become a cartoonist.  Off she went to New York City, where she contacted newspaper offices. Finding barriers to being a woman cartoonist using the name Annie, she began submitting her work as "Lou Rogers."  In 1908 her earliest known published cartoons appeared in Judge Magazine,  one of the popular nationwide humor magazines. Ms Rogers was a staff artist at Judge, regularly contributing original artwork to the suffrage page called "The Modern Woman" alongside H. G. Peter, the illustrator who created the image of Wonder Woman. By 1912 the Patten Academy Mirror announced that Annie Rogers was a cartoonist in New York City.  A year later Cartoons Magazine profiled Rogers as a successful cartoonist in "A Woman Destined to Do Big Things."  "Master cartoonist, teacher and critic" Grant Hamilton summarized her talents:
 She has what ninety-nine  out of a  hundred lack, the ability to see the way to get the idea into the picture. And she has forty ideas about everything. So far she is the only woman artist in the world who is seeking her complete artistic destiny in the cartoon. . .  She means to win. And she will keep on meaning until she does.

The Woman's Journal, a pro-suffrage newspaper, highlighted Rogers's contribution at about the same time, describing her as the "only woman artist to devote all her time to feminism." Her plan to distribute her suffrage cartoons to newspapers and for campaign literature was announced in 1914. In 1917, Margaret Sanger founded the Birth Control Review and hired Rogers as the Art Director. As late as 1924 a news story touted her as the "World's Only Woman Cartoonist," which Rogers herself corrected. New York City alone claimed, among others, resident cartoonist-illustrator Laura Foster and Edwina Dumm, as well as Cornelia Barns and Alice Beach Winter, who contributed to the radical avant-garde magazine, The Masses:

Gallery

Suffragist, feminist, socialist in Greenwich Village 

In the atmosphere of Greenwich Village, Rogers was attracted to the woman suffrage movement  and to socialism,  perceiving both movements as worthy causes to be promoted through her cartoons. Today her reputation is largely as a cartoonist for woman suffrage. She was passionate in her beliefs and prolific in her output, as her work began appearing in the New York Call, Judge, and the Woman's Journal, a propaganda newspaper for the National American Woman Suffrage Association.  She was invited to join Heterodoxy, a private club for radical, freethinking professional women, that met twice a month, for lunch and serious discussions.  She formed a close friendship with Heterodoxy member Elizabeth C. Watson,  a Maryland woman active in prison and labor reform. Both women were passengers on Henry Ford's "Peace Ship,"  which carried 102 peace delegates and 46 journalists to Europe in December 1915.  Rogers began appearing in Times Square, street corners, fairs, and  other locations dressed in her artist's smock, as she drew oversized cartoons in the tradition of chalk talks. She was considered a soapbox orator for her suffrage talks, and her activities were documented in newspapers across the region.

Rogers's endorsement of socialism paralleled  her support of women  and reflected a philosophy of human liberation.
 If the cartoon has never appealed to women workers, isn't it because it has never covered a class of interests with direct bearing on them?  Then it seems to me of great moment that national and municipal issues should be handled from the woman's standpoint as well as the man's.

She published cartoons in the socialist paper, The New York Call as early as 1911, and by 1919  was a regular contributor to the Call with a featured cartoon series on Woman's Sphere.  When American women finally achieved the vote, Rogers continued her activism by contributing cartoons to the New Yorker Volkzeitung and the Birth Control Review.

Author, illustrator, radio host 

The 1920s was a decade of productivity for Rogers. She contracted with the Ladies Home Journal to produce a series of children's stories in rhyme about imaginary little people called "Gimmicks."  The stories were accompanied by a full-page of illustrations to be cut out and mounted on cardboard allowing the child to interact with the storyline. Rogers wrote the verses and provided illustrations, providing color originals 30" in height.  Color for the illustrations was provided by Howard Smith, a New York City artist who, on October 15, 1924, became her husband. In 1927 she was invited to write a short anonymous autobiography for The Nation Magazine.  The magazine was presenting a series called "These Modern Women," and Rogers had been selected by managing editor Freda Kirchwey as a successful woman typifying new feminist possibilities.

The success of the Gimmicks persuaded Rogers to try her hand at children's books. The Rise of the Red Alders was published by Harper and Brothers in 1928.  The following year she completed Ska-Denge (Beaver for Revenge).  In the early 1930s she became a radio personality. Her program was called "Animal News Club," and aired over NBC radio.  The program offered a poster and a membership pin.  Her work was also included in a collection of women's humor, Laughing Their Way: Women's Humor in America.

Later years 

In 1925 Rogers purchased an old farm in New Milford, CT.  It was nestled in a scenic hillside and provided a quiet getaway, studio space and an opportunity for renovation. Her nieces and nephews relished their visits there, spending time with their fun-loving aunt in the countryside.

By the early 1950s, Rogers was diagnosed with amyotrophic lateral sclerosis.  Her condition degenerated rapidly, and she died at the age of 72.

Postscript 
In 1913, Cartoons Magazine had written of Rogers: "Her pen is destined to win battles for the Woman's Movement and her name will be recorded when the history of the early days of the fight for equal rights is written."

To commemorate the 75th anniversary of the Nineteenth Amendment in 1995,  the National Museum of Women in the Arts hosted an exhibition, "Artful Advocacy: Cartoons of the Woman Suffrage Movement."   Featured artists were Rogers, Nina Allender, and Blanche Ames.  Eight decades later, the prophecy had been realized.

References

Further reading 

 Rachel Schreiber, "'Breed!': the graphic satire of the Birth Control Review," in Art, Politics and the Pamphleteer, eds. Tormey, Whiteley (London: Bloomsbury, 2021.)

American women illustrators
American cartoonists
American women's rights activists
American children's writers
Greenwich Village
People from Patten, Maine
1879 births
1952 deaths
Massachusetts College of Art and Design alumni